Pakurpi-ye Sofla (also Romanized as Pāḵūrpī-ye Soflá) is a village in Hati Rural District, Hati District, Lali County, Khuzestan Province, Iran. At the 2006 census, its population was 119, in 19 families.

References 

Populated places in Lali County